Christopher Fish (born March 25, 1993) is a Swedish professional ice hockey player who currently plays for VIK Västerås HK in the HockeyAllsvenskan. He has previously played for Linköpings HC in the Swedish Hockey League (SHL).

References

External links

1993 births
Living people
Linköping HC players
Mora IK players
Örebro HK players
Swedish ice hockey right wingers
VIK Västerås HK players
Sportspeople from Örebro